Command is the fourth studio album by English electronic music group Client, released on 4 March 2009.

Track listing

Personnel
Credits adapted from Command album liner notes.

 Client – production (3, 5, 7, 8, 10)
 Toby Andersen – engineering, mixing, production (1, 2, 4, 6, 9)
 Kindle – guitar (3, 5, 10)
 Corinna Samow – artwork
 Paul Tipler – mixing (3, 5, 7, 8, 10)
 Youth – bass, guitar, production (1, 2, 4, 6, 9)
 Joe Wilson – production (3, 5, 7, 8, 10)

Release history

References

External links
 Command at Out of Line Music

2009 albums
Albums produced by Youth (musician)
Client (band) albums